Piri Beg Qajar was an early 16th-century Iranian military officer and official from the Turkoman Qajar tribe, who served under Safavid Shah ("King") Ismail I (1501-1524). He fought at the decisive Battle of Sarur in 1501 against the Ak Koyunlu; for his apparent valor, he was given an honorary name by Ismail I. In the same year, Piri Beg Qajar was appointed as the first Safavid governor (hakem) of Karabakh–Ganja.

Piri Beg Qajar is apparently one of only two attested individuals from the Qajar tribe (the other one being Acheh Soltan Qajar) who held stature during Ismail I's rule. Nevertheless, neither Piri Beg nor Acheh Soltan were leading amirs "in the sense of holding high office in the early Safavid administration".

References

Sources
 
 

15th-century births
16th-century deaths
Safavid governors of Karabakh
Safavid governors of Ganja
Iranian Turkmen people
Safavid military officers
Qajar tribe
16th-century people of Safavid Iran